Braga is a city in Portugal.

Braga may also refer to:

Associated with the Portuguese city
 Braga District containing the city
 Braga (Maximinos, Sé e Cividade), a civil parish in the city
 Braga (São José de São Lázaro e São João do Souto), a civil parish in the city
 Archdiocese of Braga
 Braga Airport
 HC Braga, a roller hockey club
 SC Braga, a sports club, including a football team

Other uses
 Braga (surname), a list of people with the name
 Braga, Rio Grande do Sul, Brazil
 Belmiro Braga, Minas Gerais, Brazil
 Braga Street, Bandung, Indonesia
 Bragă, or boza, a low-alcohol fermented grain drink

See also